Lemuel John Bagnall (1844 – 30 April 1917), was a New Zealand businessman and politician who was Mayor of Auckland City from 1910 to 1911.

Biography

Early life and career
Bagnall was born in New Glasgow, Prince Edward Island, Canada. Along with his father, George, he came to Auckland in 1864. He became involved in the timber trade and in 1878 purchased a sawmill on the Waihou river with his brothers which they operated till 1912.

Political career
Bagnall represented Thames in the Auckland Provincial Council from 1873 to 1875. He was also a member of the Thames Harbour Board, member and chairman of the Thames County Council, the Auckland Education Board and a member of the Auckland Land Board. Bagnall stood for Parliament for the Auckland Central electorate in the 1905 general election as a conservative candidate, but was defeated by Alfred Kidd. Previously he was a candidate in the Te Aroha by-election, but retired from the contest as public support for the government was strong, and that as opposition candidate he would not find sufficient support.

He was an Auckland City Councillor from 1903 to 1910. In 1910 he was elected Mayor of Auckland City, defeating councillor Patrick Nerheny. He retired from politics when his term ended in 1911.

Later life and death
He later became director of several companies; the Kauri Timber Company, the New Zealand Insurance Company, Milne & Choyce and the Auckland Farmers' Freezing Company.

Bagnall died on 30 April 1917.

Notes

References

1844 births
1917 deaths
Canadian emigrants to New Zealand
Members of the Auckland Provincial Council
Mayors of Auckland
Auckland City Councillors
Unsuccessful candidates in the 1905 New Zealand general election
20th-century New Zealand politicians